Aongus Ó Giolláin, fl. 14th-century, Irish poet.

Ó Giolláin (Gillan) is known as the author of the poem The Dead at Clonmacnoise. His details are unknown, though Ó Giolláin was a surname used by unrelated families in the kingdoms of Connacht and Tír Eogain.

See also
 Clonmacnoise

External links
 http://www.irishtimes.com/ancestor/surname/index.cfm?fuseaction=Go.&UserID=

References
 1000 Years of Irish poetry, Kathleen Hoagland New York, 1947, pp. 6–8. .

Medieval Irish poets
14th-century Irish writers
14th-century Irish poets
Irish male poets
Irish-language writers